The Canyon of Missing Men is a 1930 American silent Western film directed by J. P. McGowan and starring Tom Tyler, Sheila Bromley and Bud Osborne. Some versions of the film were released with added sound effects.

Synopsis
Dave Brandon attempts to go straight after meeting Inez Sepulveda, the attractive daughter of a ranch owner, but the members of his former gang refuse to allow him to leave.

Cast
 Tom Tyler as Dave Brandon
 Sheila Bromley as Inez Sepulveda 
 Tom B. Forman as Juan Sepulveda 
 Bud Osborne as Henchman
 Cliff Lyons as Brill Lonergan
 Bobby Dunn as Gimpy Lamb
 Arden Ellis as Peg Sagel

References

Bibliography
 Pitts, Michael R. Poverty Row Studios, 1929–1940. McFarland & Company, 2005.

External links
 

1930 films
1930 Western (genre) films
1930s English-language films
American silent feature films
Silent American Western (genre) films
Films directed by J. P. McGowan
American black-and-white films
1930s American films